Kalimantan Air Service was a planned airline based in Kalimantan, Indonesia. The airline planned to operate scheduled domestic passenger services linking towns and cities on the island of Kalimantan.

History 
The airline was established in January 2011 following an agreement between Merpati Nusantara Airlines and the four Kalimantan provincial governments.

References 

Defunct airlines of Indonesia
Airlines established in 2004